The legislative districts of Cebu City are the representations of the highly urbanized city of Cebu in the various national legislatures of the Philippines. The city is currently represented in the lower house of the Congress of the Philippines through its first and second congressional districts.

History 

What is now Cebu City initially formed part of the at-large district of Cebu province from 1898 to 1899. It later formed part of second district of Cebu for the Philippine Assembly in 1907. When seats for the upper house of the Philippine Legislature were elected from territory-based districts between 1916 and 1935, the then-municipality of Cebu formed part of the tenth senatorial district which elected two out of the 24-member senate. When the municipality of Cebu was converted into a chartered city in 1936, the city remained within the second district of Cebu province.

In the disruption caused by the Second World War, two delegates represented the chartered city (separately from the province) in the National Assembly of the Japanese-sponsored Second Philippine Republic: one was the city mayor (an ex officio member), while the other was elected through an assembly of KALIBAPI members within the city during the Japanese occupation of the Philippines. Upon the restoration of the Philippine Commonwealth in 1945, the city's representation reverted to the second district of Cebu province, of which it remained a part until 1972.

Cebu City was represented in the Interim Batasang Pambansa as part of Region VII from 1978 to 1984. After becoming a highly urbanized city in 1979 by virtue of Batas Pambansa Blg. 51, Cebu City elected two representatives, at large, to the Regular Batasang Pambansa in the 1984 elections.

Cebu City was reapportioned into two congressional districts under the new Constitution which was proclaimed on February 11, 1987. The two districts elected members to the restored House of Representatives starting that same year.

1st District (North District) 
Barangays: Adlaon, Agsungot, Apas, Bacayan, Banilad, Binaliw, Budla-an, Busay, Cambinocot, Camputhaw, Capitol Site, Carreta, Central (Santo Niño), Cogon Ramos, Day-as, Ermita, Guba, Hipodromo, Kalubihan, Kamagayan, Kasambagan, Lahug, Lorega San Miguel, Lusaran, Luz, Mabini, Mabolo Proper, Malubog, Pahina Central, Parian, Paril, Pit-os, Pulangbato, Sambag I, Sambag II, San Antonio, San Jose, San Roque, Sirao, Santa Cruz, T. Padilla, Talamban, Taptap, Tejero, Tinago, Zapatera
Population (2020): 406,378

Notes

2nd District (South District) 
Barangays: Babag, Basak Pardo, Basak San Nicolas, Bonbon, Buhisan, Bulacao, Buot-Taup, Calamba, Cogon Pardo, Duljo, Guadalupe, Inayawan, Kalunasan, Kinasang-an, Labangon, Mambaling, Pahina San Nicolas, Pamutan, Pasil, Poblacion Pardo, Pung-ol Sibugay, Punta Princesa, Quiot, San Nicolas Proper, Sapangdaku, Sawang Calero, Sinsin, Suba, Sudlon I, Sudlon II, Tabunan, Tagbao, Tisa, Toong
Population (2020): 557,791

Notes

At-large (defunct)

1943–1944

1984–1986

See also 
Legislative districts of Cebu

References 

Cebu City
Politics of Cebu City